Curio Cards are collectible digital artworks located on the Ethereum blockchain. Created in 2017, Curio Cards are commonly viewed as the first digital art collectibles on the Ethereum blockchain. In October 2021, a complete collection of Curio Cards, including the card "17b" misprint, was sold for ETH393 ($1,267,320) at the Christie's Post-War to Present auction.

Background 
The Curio Cards concept, developed by Travis Uhrig, Thomas Hunt, and Rhett Creighton, launched on May 9, 2017. Curio Cards feature multiple sets of 30 unique cards that profile artwork by seven different artists. Curio Cards is colloquially considered to be the first collection of NFT artworks on the Ethereum blockchain. On October 1, 2021, a complete collection of Curio Cards, including the digital misprint "17b", was sold by an anonymous seller for $1.2 million at Christie's Post-War to Present auction held in New York. This was the first Christie's auction where bidding was conducted solely using Ethereum cryptocurrency.

See also 
 List of most expensive non-fungible tokens
 CryptoPunks

References 

Ethereum
Blockchain and auctions
Blockchain art
Digital art